Mark Cardenas (born October 23, 1986) is a former Democratic member of the Arizona House of Representatives, serving from 2013 to 2019. Before serving in the legislature, Cardenas was a soldier (serving in the Iraq War) and an accountant. He also serves on the Estrella Village Planning Committee. In 2013, Cardenas spent a week living on the street to raise money for a transitional-living facility for female veterans.

References

External links
 
Legislative website
Twitter account

Living people
Democratic Party members of the Arizona House of Representatives
Hispanic and Latino American state legislators in Arizona
1986 births
21st-century American politicians
Politicians from Phoenix, Arizona